The 1938 Iowa gubernatorial election was held on November 8, 1938. Republican nominee George A. Wilson defeated Democratic incumbent Nelson G. Kraschel with 52.71% of the vote.

General election

Candidates
Major party candidates
George A. Wilson, Republican
Nelson G. Kraschel, Democratic 

Other candidates
Wallace M. Short, Farmer–Labor
John F. Wirds, Progressive
J. Alvin Mitchell, Prohibition

Results

References

1938
Iowa
Gubernatorial